Oskari Ikonen (3 February 1883 – 21 April 1938) was a Social Democratic Party of Finland politician. He served in the Parliament of Finland from 1913 to 1916. He supported the Reds in the Finnish Civil War of 1918. In 1927, he was exiled to the Soviet Union by the Government of Finland. During the Great Purge, he was arrested and imprisoned in February 1938 and later executed. After the death of Joseph Stalin, he was rehabilitated in 1958.

Sources
 
 KASNTn NKVDn vuosina 1937–1938 rankaisemien Suomen Eduskunnan entisten jäsenten luettelo

1883 births
1938 deaths
People from Ilomantsi
People from Kuopio Province (Grand Duchy of Finland)
Social Democratic Party of Finland politicians
Communist Party of Finland politicians
Members of the Parliament of Finland (1913–16)
People of the Finnish Civil War (Red side)
Great Purge victims from Finland
People executed by the Soviet Union
Soviet rehabilitations